Desmond King is the name of:

Desmond King (American football) (born 1994), American football player
Desmond King (professor) (born 1957), professor
Desmond King-Hele (1927–2019), British physicist and author